August Bohlin (born 7 July 1877 Österlövsta; died 19 May 1949) was a nyckelharpa and fiddler from Uppland. He is known for developing the three-row nyckelharpa of today in 1929.

August came from a musical family; his father Johan was a skilled nyckelharpist. Father and son produced three albums together in 1913 (Odeon 840, 845 and 847). On CD 2004 from www.tongang.se

References

Nyckelharpa players
People from Uppland
1877 births
1949 deaths
Swedish musicians